David E. Siminoff is a Silicon Valley investor and entrepreneur. With his wife, Ellen Siminoff, the couple have been angel investors/advisors for dozens of successful Silicon Valley start-ups, including StubHub, richrelevance, SlideShare, BlogHer and Crunchyroll.

Biography

Education 
Siminoff graduated with Honors from Stanford University, where he was a member of the varsity swimming & diving team, which went on to win multiple Pacific-10 Conference and NCAA Championships. He later earned an MFA from the USC Film School in 1989 and an MBA from Stanford Business School in 1993.

Career 
Having founded global syndicate barter company EastNet in Moscow and Eastern Europe, he graduated from business school and joined Capital Research. In his tenure at Capital Research, he focused on the technology, media, and telecommunications sectors, and his fund was an early investor in Yahoo!, eBay, Amazon, PayPal, and America Online. His investments were a key component of a top-performing growth fund, which led to Siminoff being named "Best of the Buy Side" by Institutional Investor Magazine and receiving numerous accolades from financial industry publications, including Forbes, The Wall Street Journal, and Fortune.

MySpace founder Chris DeWolfe observed, "Siminoff is an artsy guy in a suit who puts the literature of what sites do above anything else, even though he's trained as a finance guy. He was a great advisor for us as we scaled — he has a really clear vision for what's coming in the world. Entrepreneurs are clearly at the top of his pyramid."

The Wall Street Journal noted that Web executives call him "The Smoking Man", after the mysterious character on television's The X-Files who pulls the strings behind the scenes.

Institutional Investor Magazine remarked, "You can look at him from a Wall Street perspective or an industry perspective. David's very close to the technology community and has a solid sense of what's going on in the media and technology businesses. There aren't a lot of investors who get that convergence."
 
Siminoff later served as the chief executive officer of Spark Networks, a publicly traded firm which is the parent company of JDate. He was a general partner at Venrock, the Rockefeller family's venture capital arm.

In 2008 the Siminoffs co-founded Shmoop, an online educational technology publishing company that specializes in test preparation materials and study guides. Siminoff remains as Chief Creative Officer of Shmoop.

Personal life
He and his wife live in Los Altos, California. They met while students at Stanford Business School. They have two children.

He is an active pilot, formerly sharing flight duties with Eclipse Aviation partner Mark Pincus, the founder of Zynga.

References 

Living people
American computer businesspeople
American financiers
American investors
American technology chief executives
Businesspeople from the San Francisco Bay Area
People from Los Altos Hills, California
Stanford Graduate School of Business alumni
USC School of Cinematic Arts alumni
1964 births